is a Japanese manga series written and illustrated by Yukinobu Tatsu. It has been serialized in Shueisha's Shōnen Jump+ service since April 2021, with its chapters collected into nine tankōbon volumes as of March 2023.

Plot
Momo Ayase is a high school girl who believes in ghosts but not aliens, while her classmate Okarun believes in aliens but not ghosts. In a bet to determine who's correct, the two decide to separately visit locations associated with both the occult and the supernatural—Ayase visiting the former and the boy visiting the latter. When the two reach their respective places it turns out that they were half-right, both aliens and ghosts do exist.

Characters

A high school girl who believes in ghosts and the supernatural. After being abducted by Serpo aliens, she discovers she has psychokinetic powers, allowing her to visualize the "auras" of people and objects, and visualizes her power as giant hands to "grab" and control these auras. She has a crush on actor Ken Takakura and dates any guy who looks like him. Because of that, she refuses to call Okarun by his name because he doesn't look anything like him. She seems to have developed feelings for Okarun.

A shy and friendless high school boy who tries to connect with Ayase over their shared interests in the supernatural. She calls him  from "occult", since he shares a name with the actor Ken Takakura, her celebrity crush. After being possessed by the Turbo-Granny, Ken gains the ability to enter a powerful demonic state, granting him immense speed.

A spirit medium and Momo Ayase's grandmother, whom she lives with, despite appearing to be in her 20s. She helps Ayase and Okarun deal with dangerous spirits and yokai. Though she has no innate powers, she has an extensive knowledge of supernatural entities and curses, and uses various artifacts and the borrowed power of the god residing in their city to seal and exorcise yokai, though this power is only limited to the city itself.

A yokai who takes the form of a cruel, foul-mouthed elderly woman, Turbo-Granny used to comfort the spirits of girls who died horrible deaths, but started cursing and stealing the genitals of anyone who entered her territory. After Ayase and Okarun defeat her, Seiko seals her spirit inside a maneki neko doll, and she agrees to aid them for the time being until she can fully regain her powers.

A student at the same school as Ayase and Okarun. After becoming aware of the existence of the supernatural, Shiratori proclaims herself as the "chosen one" on a mission to protect the world from evil and directs her attention towards Ayase, believing that she is a demon that has to be stopped. Similar to Okarun, she can transform into a demonic form with powers inherited from a yokai called , giving her immense agility and prehensile hair. She has a crush on Okarun.

Ayase's childhood friend and first crush. He goes by the nickname . After his parents were hospitalized as a result of his house being haunted, Enjoji moved in with Ayase and Seiko before transferring over to Ayase's school. Okarun feels jealous over his relationship with Ayase, but Jiji tries to become friends with him. He is possessed by the Evil Eye, who goes on a blind rampage when in control of Jiji's body.

A powerful and sinister yokai born as a human sacrifice in the feudal period. He harbors a hatred for all humanity and tricks Jiji into forming a contract so he may eradicate them. The Evil Eye, in addition to its immense physical abilities, uses the grudges of the sacrificial victims to form powerful, nigh-invincible constructs which frequently manifest into something akin to a soccer ball.

Production
Before the serialization of Dandadan, Yukinobu Tatsu had worked as an assistant for Tatsuki Fujimoto's Chainsaw Man and Yuji Kaku's Hell's Paradise: Jigokuraku. The serialization was confirmed in the serialization meeting of Shōnen Jump+ in Spring (Q2) 2020. Tatsu however started Dandadan after the above two works had finished because he wanted to complete his role as an assistant till the end of those works.

Publication
Dandadan is written and illustrated by Yukinobu Tatsu. The series began serialization in Shueisha's Shōnen Jump+ service on April 6, 2021. Shueisha has compiled its chapters into individual tankōbon volumes. The first volume was released on August 4, 2021. As of March 3, 2023, nine volumes have been released.

The series is simultaneously published in English and Spanish on Shueisha's Manga Plus service and in English on Viz Media's Shonen Jump website. In February 2022, Viz Media announced that they had licensed the series in print format; the first volume was released on October 11 of the same year.

Volume list

Chapters not yet in tankōbon format
These chapters have yet to be published in a tankōbon volume.

Reception
By March 2023, the manga had over 2.55 million copies in circulation. By July 2021, the manga had over 22 million views on the Shōnen Jump+ platform.

In June 2021, Dandadan was nominated for the seventh Next Manga Award in the Best Web Manga category and placed second out of 50 nominees. It ranked fourth on Takarajimasha's Kono Manga ga Sugoi! 2022 list of best manga for male readers. It was nominated for the 15th Manga Taishō in 2022 and placed seventh with 53 points. The series ranked first on both the Nationwide Bookstore Employees and Publisher Comics' Recommended Comics of 2022. The series ranked fourth in Tsutaya Comic Award 2022.

References

External links
  
 
 
 

2021 manga
Action anime and manga
Exorcism in anime and manga
Extraterrestrials in anime and manga
Japanese webcomics
Romantic comedy anime and manga
Shōnen manga
Shueisha manga
Supernatural thriller anime and manga
Viz Media manga
Webcomics in print